Paul Brock was an American journalist and film producer.

Biography

Early life and education
Brock was born on 10 February 1932. He was educated at Armstrong High School. Later, he studied at Howard University.

Career
In 1951, Brock joined the U.S. Air Force as a radio reporter and later became the editor of a newspaper at Griffiss Air Force Base.

In 1968, Brock became news director at WETA-FM and started to host a news program named The Potter's House. Three years later, in 1971, he joined WUHR-FM, a Howard University radio station, as news director.

In 1975, Brock became the chief organizer of the National Association of Black Journalists after founding it.

Brock was also a fellow of the Institute for the Study of Educational Policy of Howard University.

References

1932 births
2021 deaths
African-American journalists